Woodford County is the name of two counties in the United States:

 Woodford County, Illinois
 Woodford County, Kentucky, originally Woodford County, Virginia (1788–1792)